In arithmetic, short division is a division algorithm which breaks down a division problem into a series of easier steps. It is an abbreviated form of long division — whereby the products are omitted and the partial remainders are notated as superscripts. 

As a result, a short division tableau is shorter than its long division counterpart — though sometimes at the expense of relying on mental arithmetic, which could limit the size of the divisor.

For most people, small integer divisors up to 12 are handled using memorised multiplication tables, although the procedure could also be adapted to the larger divisors as well.

As in all division problems, a number called the dividend is divided by another, called the divisor. The answer to the problem would be the quotient, and in the case of Euclidean division, the remainder would be included as well.

Using short division, arbitrarily large dividends can be handled.

Tableau

Short division does not use the slash (/) or  division sign (÷) symbols. Instead, it displays the dividend, divisor, and quotient (when it is found) in a tableau. An example is shown below, representing the division of 500 by 4. The quotient is 125.
 

Alternatively, the bar may be placed below the number, which means the sum proceeds down the page.  This is in distinction to long division, where the space under the dividend is required for workings:

Example
The procedure involves several steps. As an example, consider 950 divided by 4:

Using the alternative layout the final workings would be:

As usual, similar steps can also be used to handle the cases with a decimal dividend, or the cases where the divisor involves multiple digits.

Prime factoring

A common requirement is to reduce a number to its prime factors.  This is used particularly in working with vulgar fractions.  The dividend is successively divided by prime numbers, repeating where possible:

This results in 950 = 2 x 5² x 19

Modulo division

When one is interested only in the remainder of the division, this procedure (a variation of short division) ignores the quotient and tallies only the remainders. It can be used for manual modulo calculation or as a test for even divisibility.
The quotient digits are not written down.

The following shows the solution (using short division) of 16762109 divided by seven.

The remainder is zero, so 16762109 is exactly divisible by 7.

See also
Arbitrary-precision arithmetic
Chunking (division)
Division algorithm
Elementary arithmetic
Fourier division
Long division
Polynomial long division
Synthetic division

References

External links
Alternative Division Algorithms: Double Division, Partial Quotients & Column Division, Partial Quotients Movie
Lesson in Short Division: TheMathPage.com

Division (mathematics)